Zaigrayevo (Zagarai) is an urban locality (an urban-type settlement) and the administrative center of Zaigrayevsky District of the Republic of Buryatia, Russia. As of the 2010 Census, its population was 5,586.

Administrative and municipal status
Within the framework of administrative divisions, Zaigrayevo serves as the administrative center of Zaigrayevsky District. As an administrative division, the urban-type settlement (inhabited locality) of Zaigrayevo is incorporated within Zaigrayevsky District as Zaigrayevo Urban-Type Settlement (an administrative division of the district). As a municipal division, Zaigrayevo Urban-Type Settlement is incorporated within Zaigrayevsky Municipal District as Zaigrayevo Urban Settlement.

References

Notes

Sources

Urban-type settlements in Buryatia
Populated places in Zaigrayevsky District
